The 1973 Copa Libertadores Finals was the final two-legged tie to determine the 1973 Copa Libertadores champion. It was contested by Argentine club Independiente and Chilean club Colo-Colo. The first leg of the tie was played on 22 May at Avellaneda' home field, with the second leg played on 29 May at Santiago de Chile'.

Independiente won the series after winning a tie-breaking playoff 2-1 at Montevideo's Estadio Centenario, achieving their fourth Libertadores trophy. The final was controversial, with Chilean media and some Colo Colo players complaining about the referees, accusing them to having been bribed to favour Independiente.

Qualified teams

Venues

Match details

First leg

Second leg

Playoff

References

1
Copa Libertadores Finals
Copa Libertadores Final 1973
Copa Libertadores Final 1973
1973 in Chilean sport
1973 in Argentine football
Football in Avellaneda